This is a section in the city of Uzhhorod, Ukraine. Before World War I it was a city in the Austria-Hungary empire called Ordarma. Ordarma was a suburb of Ungvar, Hungary which became Uzhhorod.

References

Uzhhorod